Megacyllene ebenina is a species of beetle in the family Cerambycidae. It was described by Monne and Napp in 2004.

References

Megacyllene
Beetles described in 2004